All rivers in the German state of Lower Saxony flow directly or indirectly into the North Sea.

A–Z

A

B

D

E

F

G

H

I

J

K

L

M

N

O

P
Purrmühlenbach

R

S

T
Tiefenbeek
Trillkebach
Trutenbeek
Twiste

U
Uffe
Ulrichswasser
Unterelbe

V

W

Z
Zellbach
Zorge

By basin
This list uses bullets and indents to show the rivers' hierarchy and the sequence from river mouth to source. The number of indents corresponds to the river's position in the sequence.

Tributaries are shown orographically as either a left (l) or a right (r) tributary of the next waterway in the downstream direction.

Elbe 
 Elbe (into the North Sea)
 Medem (l)
 Emmelke
 Oste (l) (153 km)
 Aue (tributary of the Oste) (l) (14 km)
 Mehe (l)
 Bever (r)
 Twiste (r)
 Ramme (r)
 Schwinge (l)
 Lühe (l)
 Aue (tributary of the Elbe) (26 km)
 Este (l)
 Seeve (l) (40 km)
 Ilmenau (l) (107 km)
 Luhe (l) (58 km)
 Neetze (r) (48 km)
 Gerdau (30 km)
 Stederau
 Jeetzel (l) (73 km)
 Aland (l) (27 km)
 Ohre (l) (103 km)
 Saale (l) (Saxony-Anhalt)
 Bode (l) (169 km)
 Unstrut (l) (Thuringia)
 Helme (l) (Thuringia)
 Zorge (l)
 Wieda (r)
 Uffe (r)

Weser 
 Weser (into the North Sea)
 Geeste (r) (>25 km)
 Abbehauser Sieltief (l)
 Lune (r) (43 km)
 Schweiburg (left branch of Weser river)
 Strohauser Sieltief (l)
 Drepte (r)
 Rechter Nebenarm der Weser (right branch of Weser river)
 Aschwardener Flutgraben
 Braker Sieltief (l)
 Käseburger Sieltief (l)
 Hunte (l) (198 km)
 Haaren (l)
 Lethe (l)
 Westergate (left branch of Weser river)
 Schönebecker Aue (r)
 Lesum (r) (10 km)
 Hamme (48 km)
 Scharmbecker Bach (r)
 Wienbeck (r)
 Beek (r)
 Wümme (118 km)
 Wörpe (r)
 Wieste (r)
 Rodau (l)
 Vissel (l)
 Wiedau (l)
 Veerse (l)
 Fintau (l)
 Ochtum (l)
 Delme (l)
Varreler Bäke (l)
 Hache (l)
 Aller (r) (211 km)
 Gohbach (r) (20 km)
 Lehrde (r) (22 km)
 Böhme (r) (68 km)
 Fulde (r) (11 km)
 Warnau (r)
 Bomlitz (r)
 Leine (l) (281 km)
 Grindau (r) (11 km)
 Westaue (l)
 Südaue (r)
 Möseke (r)
 Sachsenhäger Aue
 Rodenberger Aue
 Fösse (l)
 Ihme (l) (16 km)
 Innerste (r) (95 km)
 Lamme (l)
 Nette (l) (43 km)
 Haller (l)
 Saale (l)
 Aue (tributary of the Leine) (r)
 Ilme (l)
 Dieße (r)
 Rhume (r) (48 km)
 Söse (r) (38 km)
 Große Söse (l headstream)
 Kleine Söse (r headstream)
 Große Limpig (r)
 Eipenke (l)
 Ospenke (l)
 Lerbach (r) (8 km)
 Apenke (l)
 Große Bremke (r)
 Wellbeek (r)
 Uferbach (r)
 Sulpebach (r)
 Markau (r)
 Bierbach (r)
 Dornkesbach (r)
 Goldbach (r)
 Salza (l)
 Dorster Mühlenbach (l)
 Oder (r) (56 km)
 Pöhlder Beber (l)
 Sperrlutter (r)
 Lutter (tributary of the Oder) (r) (2.2 km)
 Sieber (r) (35 km)
 Garte (r) (23 km)
 Wietze (l) (30 km)
 Örtze (r) ( 55 km)
 Wietze (r) (29 km)
 Fuhse (l) (98 km)
 Erse (r)
 Lachte (r) (38 km)
 Lutter (tributary of the Lachte) (r)
 Köttelbeck (l)
 Schmalwasser (l)
 Oker (l) (105 km)
 Schunter (r) (58 km)
 Wabe (l)
 Lutter (tributary of the Schunter) (l)
 Altenau (r)
 Warne (l)
 Ilse (r) (40 km)
 Ecker (r)
 Radau (r)
 Abzucht (l) (12.1 km)
 Gose (l) (13 km)
 Gelmke (r) (10 km)
 Dörpke (r)
 Ise (r) (50 km)
 Meerbach (r)
 Große Aue (l)
 Aue (tributary of the Weser) (r)
 Werre (l) (North Rhine-Westphalia)
 Else (l) (35 km)
 Warmenau (r)
 Hase (169 km)
 Hamel (r)
 Emmer (l)
 Ilse (r)
 Lenne (r)
 Schwülme (r)
 Ahle (r)
 Fulda
 Werra

Ems 
 Ems (into the North Sea)
 Knockster Tief (r)
 Fehntjer Tief (r)
 Fehntjer Tief (southern branch)
 Fehntjer Tief (northern branch)
 Flumm (r)
 Leda (r) (29 km)
 Jümme (r)
 Barßeler Tief
 Soeste (l)
 Sagter Ems (l)
 Nordradde (r)
 Hase (r)
 Mittelradde (r)
 Südradde (r)
 Große Aa (r)

Vechte 
 Vechte (into the Zwarte Water, Netherlands)
 Dinkel (l) (93 km)
 Coevorden-Vecht Canal (r) (Netherlands)
 Coevorden-Piccardie Canal (l) (Netherlands)
 Grenzaa (r)

Jade 
 Jade (into the North Sea)
 Maade (l)
 Wapel (l)

!
Lower Saxony
Lower Saxony-related lists